Greg Lee Haugen (born August 31, 1960) is an American former professional boxer from 1982 to 1999. He is a world champion in two weight classes, having held the IBF lightweight title twice between 1986 to 1989 and the WBO light welterweight title in 1991.

Professional career
Haugen turned pro in 1982 and won his first 17 fights before challenging for a world title. On December 5, 1986, Haugen captured the IBF lightweight title with 
a majority decision over reigning champion Jimmy Paul.

He lost his title in his first defense to Vinny Pazienza by decision. However, he won the title back in a rematch with Pazienza in 1988. He defended the title against Miguel Santana and future WBO welterweight champion Gert Bo Jacobsen.

He lost the IBF lightweight title to Pernell Whitaker in 1989 by decision, it was his biggest paycheck at that time at $426,000.

On February 23, 1991, he captured the WBO light welterweight title with an upset victory over then undefeated Hector Camacho by split decision, an outcome that resulted from Camacho being deducted a point for illegally hitting Haugen when Haugen refused to touch gloves at the beginning of the last round. After his fight with Camacho; Haugen tested positive for marijuana and was fined $25,000. Later that year Haugen lost a rematch with Camacho, again by split decision.

In 1992, he captured the vacant NABF light welterweight title with a knockout win over Ray "Boom Boom" Mancini.

On February 20, 1993, he challenged Mexican legend Julio César Chávez for the WBC light welterweight title at Azteca Stadium in Mexico City, a fight attended by 132,247 spectators. Haugen's legacy is likely best defined by the Chavez fight, but not for his performance in the ring. Leading up to the bout, Haugen made the comment that many of Chavez’s wins "came against Tijuana taxi drivers that my mom could whip." This generated a huge uproar in the Mexican community and ignited publicity for the bout. Within seconds of the opening round, Chavez dropped Haugen with a straight right hand, but rather than dispatching him quickly, pulled back with the intent of punishing him for his pre-fight remarks. After several more rounds of punishment, Chavez dropped him again in the 5th round, and after delivering another barrage of punches, the referee intervened and waved it off. It marked the first stoppage loss of Haugen's career. Afterwards, Haugen remarked: "They must have been very tough taxi drivers." Haugen never again challenged for a major belt. When asked in an interview who was the greatest fighter he ever fought, Haugen replied, "Hands down, Pernell Whitaker." He made excuses for his loss to Chavez which he was still struggling to come to terms with, describing it as his "biggest regret."

He retired in 1999 with a record of 40–10–1 (2 NC).

See also
 List of boxing triple champions

References

External links
 

|-

|-

1960 births
Living people
World boxing champions
International Boxing Federation champions
American people of Norwegian descent
Doping cases in boxing
Boxers from Washington (state)
People from Auburn, Washington
American male boxers
Lightweight boxers